Donald Paul Ravis (born 28 February 1940) was a Progressive Conservative party member of the House of Commons of Canada. He was a businessman and reservist by career.

He was elected at Saskatoon East electoral district in the 1984 federal election, thus he served in the 33rd Canadian Parliament. In the 1988 federal election by, his riding became Saskatoon—Humboldt and he was defeated by Stan Hovdebo of the New Democratic Party.

References
 

1940 births
Living people
Members of the House of Commons of Canada from Saskatchewan
Progressive Conservative Party of Canada MPs